Kavchut is a village in the Kajaran Municipality of the Syunik Province in Armenia. In 1988-1989 Armenian refugees from Azerbaijan settled in the village.

Geography 
Nearby towns and villages include Baharlu, Verin Giratagh, Kuchuma, Nerkin Giratagh, Lerrnadzor and Musallam.

Municipal administration 
The village was a part of the community of Lernadzor until the June 2017 administrative and territorial reforms, when the village became a part of the Kajaran Municipality.

Demographics 
The village's population was 88 at the 2011 census, down from 112 at the 2001 census.

References 

Populated places in Syunik Province